A list of films produced in France in 1922:

See also
1922 in France

References

External links
French films of 1922 on IMDb
French films of 1922 at Cinema-francais.fr

1922
Lists of 1922 films by country or language
Films